Vice Admiral Sir Simon Jonathan Woodcock,  (born 5 July 1962) is a retired Royal Navy officer who served as Second Sea Lord from 2015 to 2018.

Naval career
Educated at Ryde School and Britannia Royal Naval College, Woodcock joined the Royal Navy in 1984. He served as Commander (Engineering) in HMS Ark Royal and saw action during Operation Telic as Staff Marine Engineer to the Amphibious Task Group. He went on to be Chief of Staff to the Capability Manager Precision Attack at the Ministry of Defence in December 2003, commanding officer of the Royal Naval School of Marine Engineering in March 2005 and commanding officer of the basic training unit HMS Raleigh in January 2008. After that he became Head of Pay and Manning in the Ministry of Defence in April 2010, Director Naval Personnel at Fleet Headquarters in January 2012 and Naval Secretary in September 2012.

He became Second Sea Lord in March 2015, retiring from the position in March 2018. He retired from the Royal Navy on 30 June 2018.

Woodcock was appointed an Officer of the Order of the British Empire (OBE) in the 2008 Birthday Honours and knighted as a Knight Commander of the Order of the Bath (KCB) in the 2018 New Year Honours.

References

|-

1962 births
Living people
Military personnel from the Isle of Wight
Knights Commander of the Order of the Bath
Officers of the Order of the British Empire
People educated at Ryde School with Upper Chine
Royal Navy vice admirals